St. Peter’s Lutheran Church is a church located in Kinde, Michigan. It is a member of the Michigan District of the Lutheran Church–Missouri Synod.

History

The church has its roots in the ghost town of Port Crescent, Michigan. In 1844, Rev. W. Swartz of Ruth, Michigan organized the area Lutherans and ultimately founded the church under the name of The German Evangelical Lutheran St. Peters Church of Port Crescent in 1873. Services were held in private homes. In 1893, the congregation, under Rev. E. Berner, purchased the All Saints Episcopalian Church, which had been built in 1885.

In 1901, Mr. Albert Iseler donated an acre of land to Zion Church.

In 1907, the businessmen of Kinde, Michigan offered the congregation $130 and a plot of land to relocate to their town. The congregation accepted and the church building was moved from Port Crescent. Since then the church has been served by many pastors and joined with Zion Lutheran Church in 1950.

A  addition to the church itself was completed in 1954.

The addition of a hall was completed in 2005. The $200,000,  structure contains offices and meeting areas, allowing the congregation to sell the former Methodist church building.

In 2010, the church served as a scene in the movie This Must be the Place starring Sean Penn.

Present

, St. Peter's Lutheran Church is served by Pastor Larry K. Loree Sr. The church has 68 baptized members with 45 congregants on an average Sunday.

References 

Lutheran churches in Michigan
Buildings and structures in Huron County, Michigan
German-American culture in Michigan
Lutheran Church–Missouri Synod churches